Comines is a commune of the Nord department in northern France.

Geography
The town of Comines sits on the Franco-Belgian border and is split into two parts: Comines (France) and Comines (Belgium), part of the municipality of Comines-Warneton.

Population

Heraldry

Sights
The belfry of Comines was listed as a UNESCO World Heritage Site as part of the Belfries of Belgium and France in 2005, in recognition of its importance to the history of municipal power in Europe.

See also
Communes of the Nord department

References

Communes of Nord (French department)
Divided cities
Belgium–France border crossings
French Flanders